is one of the "Big Four" law firms in Japan.

The firm was founded in July 8, 1952 as O'Gorman, Nattier & Anderson after its three initial partners who were all American attorneys. The firm merged with Shenoh & Mōri in 1961 to form Anderson, Nattier, Mōri & Rabinowitz, which was renamed to Anderson Mōri & Rabinowitz in 1963. The firm changed its name to Anderson & Mōri in 1991 following the departure of partner Richard Rabinowitz, who joined several other Anderson Mori attorneys to form the firm of Tōzai Sōgō in 1994. The firm adopted its present name after merging with Tomotsune & Kimura in 2005; Tomotsune & Kimura was itself an offshoot of the law firm founded by Toshiro Nishimura in 1967, which would eventually become Nishimura & Asahi.

Following the collapse of Bingham McCutchen in 2014, 50 of the 60 lawyers at Bingham's Tokyo office joined Anderson Mori in 2015, with the remainder joining the Tokyo office of Morgan, Lewis & Bockius.

Anderson operates as a two-tiered partnership, under which associates become non-equity "junior partners" in their 10th to 12th year of practice, but only become equity-holding senior partners at a later stage (if ever).

The firm joined Ius Laboris in 2014.

Offices
Anderson Mori's main office is in Otemachi Park Building, Otemachi, Chiyoda-ku, Tokyo.

Its first overseas office was in Beijing, opened in 1998. As of 2017, the firm has two domestic branch offices in Osaka and Nagoya, and five overseas offices in Beijing, Shanghai, Singapore, and Ho Chi Minh City and Bangkok. It also has associated firms in Hong Kong, Jakarta and Singapore. The firm's Asian offices focus on supporting Japanese clients abroad.

Notable people

 Kunio Hamada, former Supreme Court justice, founding partner of one of the forerunner firms of Mori Hamada & Matsumoto
 Katsuhito Yokokume, member of the House of Representatives, worked as an Anderson Mori associate from 2007 to 2008

References

External links 
Official website

Law firms of Japan
Law firms established in 1952